William Hogeland is an American historian, author, and commentator.

Bibliography

References

External links

Living people
Year of birth missing (living people)